This is a list of the schools and colleges in Namakkal district.

Engineering colleges
 J.K.K.Nattraja College of Engineering and Technology, Komarapalayam
 Vetri Vinayaha College of Engineering and Technology, Namakkal
 Paavai Engineering College, Namakkal
 Paavai College of Engineering, Namakkal
 Pavai College of Technology, Namakkal
 K. S. Rangasamy College of Technology, Tiruchengode
 Muthayammal Engineering college, Rasipuram
 King College of Technology, Nallur, Namakkal
 Mahendra Engineering College, Mallasamudram, Thiruchengode-Salem main road
 KSR Institute for Engineering and Technology, Tiruchengode, Namakkal, India - 637215

Pharmacy colleges 
 J.K.K. Nattraja College of Pharmacy, Komarapalayam

Dental colleges 
 K.S.R. Institute of Dental Science and Research, Tiruchengode
 J.K.K.Nattraja Dental College and Hospital, Komarapalayam

Nursing colleges 
 J.K.K.Nattraja College of Nursing and Research, Komarapalayam

Polytechnic colleges 
 Sri Vengateswaraa Polytechnic College, Vennandur
Voice of God Polytechnic College, Varagur

Arts and science colleges
 Namakkal Kavignar Ramaligam Government Arts College for Women, Namakkal
 Thiruvalluvar Government Arts College, Rasipuram
 J.K.K. Nattraja College of Arts & Science, Komarapalayam
 K. S. R. College of Arts and Science, Tiruchengode
 A.A. Govt. Arts College for Men, Namakkal

B.Ed colleges
 Government College of Education, Komarapalayam
 J.K.K.Nattraja College of Education, Komarapalayam

Management colleges
 K. S. Rangasamy College of Technology, Tiruchengode

Schools

Matriculation schools
 J.K.K.Nattraja Matriculation Higher Secondary School, Komarapalayam

Elementary schools
 J.K.K.Nattraja Vidhyalya, Komarapalayam

References 

Namakkal
Education in Namakkal district